The First Robot Olympics. took place in Glasgow, Scotland on 27–28 September 1990.

The event was run by The Turing Institute at the Sports Centre at the University of Strathclyde. It featured 68 robots from 12 countries and involved over 2,500 visitors over the two-day period.

Background 
During the 1990s the Turing Institute had been involved in a wide range of robotics activities and had developed links with many leading robotics laboratories as a result of both student exchange and a series of collaborative research projects.

The event was conceived and directed by Dr Peter Mowforth, director of the Turing Institute, as an events-based meetup for robot enthusiasts and builders. Although there had been single event competitions and national events for competing robots, this was the first time that such a large, varied and international Robot Competition had taken place.

Many of the robots that came to the event reflected key research themes that were present at the time. For example, the two-wheeled balancing 'torch carrying' (pre-Segway) robot that opened the event was associated with the institute's work on using machine learning applied to the inverted pendulum

Strathclyde University was an academic associate of and adjacent to the Turing Institute. The university made their sports hall complex available for the two-day event.

Events and results

National medals table

Disqualifications 

Four judges supervised the events to ensure 'fair play'. They were:
 •  Professor Frank Nage, University of Salford
 •  Professor Ruzena Bajcsy, University of Pennsylvania
 •  Eddie Grant (IEEE Representative, University of Strathclyde)
 •  Professor Hans P. Moravec, Carnegie Mellon University

Special awards

Several organisions provided special awards for different categories of competition.

IEEE Robotics & Automation Society Young Roboticist Award Brian Carr (School pupil), St Patricks High School, Coatbridge, Scotland. Awarded £25 book token.

NatWest Bank Prize for Technology Transfer Olaf Beck, Prof. Rodney Brookes & Colin Angle, Massachusetts Institute of Technology MIT, AI Lab, USA Awarded with a Caithness Crystal bowl and £200 from NatWest Bank.

'Turing Institute Best School Prize' XYBOT Inverkeithing School, Class 7S, Scotland. Awarded with a cup and a cheque for £100.

'Olympic Champion' YAMABICO from Tsukuba University, Japan. Prize given to Shoji Suzuki. Awarded with a Caithness Glass Trophy.

Photographs

Sponsorship 
As well as being organised by The Turing Institute and hosted by the University of Strathclyde, the event had seven main sponsors:
 NatWest Bank (London)
 IEEE (Robotics & Automation Society)
 Scottish Development Agency
 Stakis Hotels (Glasgow)
 Caithness Glass
 Holiday Inn (Glasgow)
 British Gas (Olympic Torch and Olympic flame)

References 

Robotics in the United Kingdom
University of Strathclyde
1990 in Scotland
1990s in Glasgow